Mr & Mrs Unwanted is 2016 Marathi Social Film starring Actor Rajesh Shisatkar & Actress Smita Gondkar.It is Directed by Dinesh Anant and Produced by Mitang Bhupendra Raval. The movie also got nominated in KIFF & NIFF where they grabbed 'Best Jury Mention Film' Award & Best Actress Award at KIFF and 'Best Social Film' Award at NIFF.

Plot
A story of a corporate working couple, a catch between Profession & Personal Life. Riya and Rajesh are happily staying together at a friend's bungalow. Though they have booked a new house for themselves, but they haven't got its possession yet. Riya works as an event manager in an event company while Rajesh works in a private bank as a Manager.

Cast
Smita Gondkar as Riya
Rajendra Shisatkar as Rajesh
Shilpa Khule Vaidya
Ajay Aambekar
Shekhar Hardikar

Awards
Best Jury Mention Film - (KIFF) Kalyan International Film Festival 2016
Smita Gondkar - Best Actress - (KIFF) Kalyan International Film Festival 2016
Best Social Film - (NIFF) Nashik International Film Festival 2016

References

 http://marathicineyug.com/movies/upcoming-movies/1644-mr-and-mrs-unwanted
 http://marathicineyug.com/news/exclusive/1642-mr-mrs-unwanted-a-comparative-journey-between-home-and-career
 https://www.youtube.com/watch?v=W0dZNWR545A
 http://marathicineyug.com/news/latest-news/1588-mr-mrs-unwanted-is-all-set-for-its-grand-release-on-23-september-2016
 http://www.esakal.com/Tiny.aspx?K=bB5XQP

2010s Marathi-language films
2016 films